Zoran Madzirov (14 January 1968 – 9 May 2017) was a Macedonian percussionist, composer and the inventor of the Bottlephone.

Biography 
Zoran performed with and was honored by stars such as Sting, Tito Puente, Tina Turner, Harry Belafonte, Scorpions, Tommy Emmanuel and others. He founded the group Les Barons Karamazoff in 1987 with Edin Karamazov (guitar, lute) and Sasa Dejanovic (Guitar). Madzirov died on 9 May 2017  due to consequences from a traffic accident. He was 49.

Discography 
 2006  Bottling Jazzy, Aquarius International
 2010  Roots On A Roof (Balkano Nuevo), SJF Records – SJF 127
2011 – Bottling Classic 
2011 – Bottlephonia Baroque

References

External links
 

1968 births
2017 deaths
People from Strumica
Macedonian musicians